Panama competed at the 1952 Summer Olympics in Helsinki, Finland. It was the nations third time competing in the Olympics since 1928.

References
Official Olympic Reports

Nations at the 1952 Summer Olympics
1952 Summer Olympics
1952 in Panama